Barbara Merlin (born 12 January 1972) is an Italian former alpine skier.

Career
During her career she has achieved 8 results among the top 5 in the World Cup. She competed in the 1992 Winter Olympics, the 1994 Winter Olympics, and the 1998 Winter Olympics.

World Cup results
Top 5

National titles
Merlin has won four national championships at individual senior level.

Italian Alpine Ski Championships
Dopwnhill: 1992 (1)
Super-G: 1994 (1)
Combined: 1992, 1993 (2)

References

External links
 

1972 births
Living people
Italian female alpine skiers
Olympic alpine skiers of Italy
Alpine skiers at the 1992 Winter Olympics
Alpine skiers at the 1994 Winter Olympics
Alpine skiers at the 1998 Winter Olympics
Sportspeople from Turin
Alpine skiers of Fiamme Oro